The Diocese of Santa Giusta, formerly Othoca, was a Roman Catholic diocese in Santa Giusta, Sardinia. The bishop's seat was in the former Santa Giusta Cathedral, now a minor basilica.

The diocese was established in 1119 and abolished in 1503, when it was absorbed into the Archdiocese of Oristano.

Since 1969 Santa Giusta has been a titular bishopric.

Sources
Catholic Hierarchy: Titular See of Santa Giusta
Catholic Hierarchy: Diocese of Santa Giusta (Othoca)

Former Roman Catholic dioceses in Italy
Dioceses established in the 12th century